The 74th Assembly District of Wisconsin is one of 99 districts in the Wisconsin State Assembly.  Located in northern Wisconsin, the district comprises all of Ashland, Bayfield, Price, and Iron counties, along with southeast Douglas County and parts of northern Sawyer County.  It includes the cities of Ashland, Bayfield, Park Falls, and Washburn, and the Bad River and Red Cliff Indian reservations.  The district also contains the Apostle Islands National Lakeshore, Big Bay State Park, and most of the Chequamegon National Forest, as well as Timms Hill—the highest natural point in the state of Wisconsin.  The district is represented by Republican Chanz Green, since January 2023.

The 74th Assembly district is located within Wisconsin's 25th Senate district, along with the 73rd and 75th Assembly districts. The district is also located entirely within Wisconsin's 7th congressional district.

Politically, the 74th Assembly district is unique as one of the few remaining competitive seats in Wisconsin's heavily gerrymandered legislative map.

List of past representatives

References 

Wisconsin State Assembly districts
Ashland County, Wisconsin
Bayfield County, Wisconsin
Douglas County, Wisconsin
Price County, Wisconsin
Iron County, Wisconsin
Sawyer County, Wisconsin
Vilas County, Wisconsin